MicroBee (or Micro Bee) was a series of networkable home computers by Applied Technology, which became publicly listed company MicroBee Systems Limited soon after its release. The original Microbee computer was designed in Australia by a team including Owen Hill and Matthew Starr.

The MicroBee's most distinctive features are its user configurable video display (capable of mimicking the displays of other computers and devices including the TRS-80, Sorcerer and SOL20 with later colour and graphic models 40 and 80 column terminals, Super-80, ZX Spectrum, early arcade machines, Amstrad CPC 464) and its battery backed non-volatile RAM and small size allowing it to be powered off, transported, and powered back on and resume activities on the currently loaded program or document.

It was originally packaged as a two board unit with the lower "baseboard" containing all components except the system memory which was mounted on the upper "core board".

Components
The original main board consisted of:

 Z80 CPU
 Z80 PIO
 6545 CRT controller
 2 KB Screen RAM
 2 KB Character ROM (128 characters)
 2 KB Programmable Character Graphics (PCG) RAM (128 characters)
 Keyboard
 Speaker
 Tape Input/Output
 Video Out
 Serial Port
 User Parallel Port
 Power Connector

The original coreboards consisted of:

 Either 32KB capacity or 56KB capacity 6116 battery backed Non-volatile RAM 
 Either 16KB BASIC ROM or 4KB BOOT ROM
 50 way System Expansion port
 Provision for 8KB Expansion ROM on 32KB Max capacity version

A floppy disk drive unit and S-100 Bus expansion unit were available. They connected to a microbee by a 50 way ribbon cable to the System Expansion port.

The microbee had two networking options - BeeNet and StarNet.  The BeeNet was a low cost low speed LAN (Local Area Network) for 16-32K ROM Models and the StarNet was for the 64K and  larger DRAM models.

The BeeNet uses a bus topology that uses synchronous serial transfers.  The StarNet uses a single Star topology using dedicated 8 bit parallel data bus connections between the central hub and its remote spokes.

Ancestry 
The microbee was the integration, simplification and modernisation of the following S-100 cards sold by Applied Technology, Microworld BASIC and DGOS Monitor for their System Z.A.T. chassis.

 DG680 CPU - Z80 Single board Computer designed by David Griffiths
 MW640/DG640 VDU  - Visual Display Unit designed by David Griffiths. (The DG640 VDU was itself was based upon the Processor Technology VDM-1.)
 TCT-PCG  - Programmable Character Generator for the DG640 VDU designed by Craig Barratt
 MW864 - MEGAMEMORY  64K Static RAM Memory board designed by Owen Hill
 MW2516  - 16K ROM 16K ROM Card designed by Owen Hill
 MW6545 - User Programmable VDU designed by John Wilmshurst

The removal of the S-100 bus support and configuration hardware and some other features made the microbee much simpler and cheaper than its ancestors.

Examples:

 The VDU Attribute RAM of the DG640 VDU was not employed in the original microbee (but was reinstated in a modified and extended form for the Premium Series Microbee)
 Z80 CTC (Counter Timer Counter)
 Tape motor on/off control
 8 bit input sense port
 Configuration DIP switches

The utilisation of higher density memory devices made also the microbee smaller. HM6116 (2K x 8 bit) were instead of the earlier 2101 (1K x 1bit) and 2114 (1K x 4bit) static RAMS and 2732 (4K x 8 bit) ROMs instead of 2516 (2K x 8) ROMs as program ROM.  Subsequent models used the even denser HM6264 (8K x 8 bit) static RAMs, 4164 (64K x 1 bit) dynamic RAM and 27128 (16K x 8 bit) 2764 (8K x 8) program ROMs.

Kit beginnings

The computer was released as a kit, with assembly instructions included in Your Computer magazine, in February 1982.  After a successful bid for the New South Wales Department of Education computer tender, the computer was repackaged in a two-tone beige and black case, and sold pre-built. The  ROM held the MicroWorld BASIC interpreter written by Matthew Starr and DGOS (David Griffiths Operating System) compatible System Monitor. In addition to the  there is additional ROM socket for optional programs such as WORDBEE (Word processor) or EDASM (a Z80 Editor/Assembler that was written by Ron Harris).

The IC model 
It also included a  "Telcom" terminal emulator ROM.

Disk machines 
A floppy disk based machine was also released in 1983.  Early disk machines used  of static RAM, with a  BIOS ROM.  They ran CP/M 2.2.  The disk controller, based on the Western Digital WD1793 Floppy Disk Controller chip was contained in an add-on card that connected to the core board.  The machine used 5.25" floppy disks.

Dynamic RAM disk machines with  followed soon after, with a WD2793 Floppy Disk Controller incorporated on the core board.  Later disk machines used .

Colour 

A colour machine was also released in 1983, called the "32K Personal Communicator".  This added a second byte of RAM for each character position, allowing each character to have 2 colours.  The foreground colour has 32 possible values (5 bits) and are determined by the contents of the 82S123 PROM located on the colour board.  Not all foreground colours combinations are unique with only 27 being possible.  The background colours were made up from the remaining 3 bits of the colour RAM byte (8 colours) and another 3 bits on a colour control port that controlled the RGB background intensity level.  This allowed the intensity of each of the RGB colours to be set to full or half intensity but only 7 different values could be in effect at any one time and changing the intensity value would affect the entire display.  The extra colour circuitry required an additional board mounted under the main board, with numerous messy connections to the main board.

The Premium, 256TC and Teleterm models released in 1986 incorporated colour on the main board and used a different colour design compared to the earlier model and was not compatible for the resultant colours that were produced but application and system software will work on either hardware designs.  The later colour design was largely compatible with the Color Graphics Adapter used on the IBM PC where 4 bits were used for the foreground and another 4 bits for the background colours.

The B-ETI Serial Terminal 

The B-ETI was a Microbee-based serial terminal.  It could emulate either an ADM-3A or Televideo 912 terminal.  The display format was monochrome  and it supported communication at either 300 or 1200 baud.  An advertisement for a "special introductory offer" with an asking price of  appeared in the December 1983 issue of Electronics Today International magazine.

Introduction, BETI Users Guide:

The BETI was designed as a low cost serial terminal operating at speeds of up to 4800 baud (1200 baud without handshaking). The BETI also provides optional automatic code conversion to and from the baudot 5 level code used for RTTY and TELEX applications.

Specifications:

 Codes supported: US ASCII and CCITT BAUDOT.
 Baud rates: 45.5, 50, 75, 110, 300, 600, 1200, 2400, 4800.
 Default settings: 4800 baud US ASCII full duplex.
 Emulation: ADM-3A and TVI 912C (except for attributes).
 RS232 port: Configured as DTE with 0-12V swing.
 Parallel port: Connects to Centronics printer with adapter.
 Internal buffer: 1800 bytes.
 Power supply read: 9 - 12 V at 800 mA.
 Video output: Composite video: negative sync, 1V p-p into 75 ohms, 50 Hz frame, 15625 Hz line frequency.
 Screen format: 80 characters by 24 for lines, 64 by 16 lines for setup mode.
 Attribute: Reverse video, enabled by escape sequence.
 Keyboard: Full size, 60 key QWERTY layout, positive travel. Two shot moulded key tops.
 Microprocessor: Z80A at 3.375 MHz.
 Control program: 4k 2532 EPROM.
 Sound generation: Built in loudspeaker for BELL.
 Case: 342mm W × 239mm D × 42mm H. Injection moulded ABS.

The Premium Series MicroBee 

In 1985, a new mainboard was introduced. The resulting machine was called the "Premium Series" model. PCG RAM was sufficient to allow full  mapped displays with a limited colour palette. These machines were typically sold with dual-floppy drives (or a  'Winchester' disc) held in a monitor stand that connected to the main unit.

Physical coding for tape storage 

Standard MicroBee Tapes are encoded at  using its own variation of Processor Technology's SOLOS/CUTER Tape protocol that consists of a 300 baud metadata header followed by data payload blocks encoded at the desired transfer rate using CUTS (Computer Users Tape System).

The wav2dat software converts audio data into Microbee files.

Books 
 
A few books were written about the Microbee, including:
 Wildcards - By Robert Alan Burt, Peter Terence Ford, and Ash Nallawalla 
 Wildcards 2 - By Robert Alan Burt, Peter Terence Ford, and Ash Nallawalla 
 Wildcards 3 - By Robert Alan Burt, Peter Terence Ford, and Ash Nallawalla 
 Wildcards 4 - By Robert Alan Burt, Peter Terence Ford, and Ash Nallawalla
 Getting started on your MicroBee - By Petr Lukes and Tim Hartnell
 Shake hands with the Microbee - By Pam Kelly-Hartley, Joy McKneil and Tony Melius
 The Penguin book of Microbee games - By David Johns and edited by Tim Hartnell
 The Winners - compiled by the Sydney Microbee User's Group

Games 
Games for the MicroBee include both original titles and clones of pre-existing games, including:

 Asteroids
 Emu Joust - a Joust clone
 Halloween Harry
 Hoards of the Deep Realm
 Microspace Invaders
 Robotman - a Pac-Man clone by Paul Wilmhurst
 Wumpus
 Cricket
 Toady - a word guessing game
 Lemonade Stall - a game for budding business entrepreneurs.
 Underworld of Kin - By Andy William Farrell
 Sword Quest - a dungeons and dragons style game by P Jepson and C Temple
 Scrambler
 Gorilla Maths - a mental maths challenge with inklings of Donkey Kong

As well, numerous adventure games were written, mainly in BASIC, plus educational software.

Final versions 

The final version of the MicroBee, released in 1987, was the 256TC. Bundled software included "Videotex" (a videotex terminal program), "Simply Write" (a word processor) and "Telcom" (a serial terminal emulator program).

MicroBee Systems also designed a PC clone, called the "Matilda", or 640TC, which ran an NEC V40 (see NEC V20 chip), and emulated the MicroBee CP/M systems in software.

An advanced next generation model code named "Gamma", based on the Motorola 68010 and two Zilog Z80 processors, was designed but never made it to the market.

In 1992, after having undergone a number of ownership changes, the company ceased trading.

Legacy
After almost 20 years, the Microbee brand was re-launched in 2012 by Microbee Technology Pty Ltd, run by a Microbee employee from the 1980s, Ewan Wordsworth. The company produced a limited edition (100 unit only) kit, the Premium Plus. The new version was still Z80-based and followed the original two-board design. It had dual-processor architecture, with some enhancements such as floppy emulation of the SD memory card.

In popular culture 
In the '80s parody movie Kung Fury, Hackerman is hacking the timeline with MicroBee computers (along with a ZX Spectrum and a Power Glove) and Kung Fury himself also rides in the cyberspace on a MicroBee.

References

External links

 The Microbee Software Preservation Project (MSPP) - Discussion Forum, File Repository & Photo Gallery
 Discussion Forum for all things Microbee & extensive File Repository
 MicroBee Documents, Projects, Software, Advertisements, Emulators And Resources
 The PC Museum, Applied Technology page
 Matthew Geier's notes and pictures, including a working "Gamma"
 Microbee Documentation Project
 The Powerhouse Museum (Sydney Australia) - K1431 Microcomputer, "Microbee" 16KROM, early Kit computer.
 Alistair Shilton's "Archaic Electronics Labyrinth" including a page (Picomozzy - the Microbee 32k Emulator) with scans of Microbee technical reference manualsArchived version
 The Microbee ArchiveArchived version
 The Microbee story
 The Microbee Beeboard - Virtual Museum, Discussion Forum & File Repository
 Australian Computer Museum Society Inc microbee page
 OLD-COMPUTERS.COM - Microbee 32 page
 OLD-COMPUTERS.COM - Microbee 128 page
 OLD-COMPUTERS.COM - Microbee Computer-In-A-Book page

Emulators
 uBee512 MicroBee emulator
 Web-based MicroBee emulator

Z80-based home computers
Home computers